The Battle of Samobor on March 1, 1441 was fought between the forces of Ulrich II of Celje and Stjepan Banić around Samobor, in what was then the Kingdom of Slavonia within the Kingdom of Hungary.

In a struggle for succession to the Crown of St. Stephen, Banić was allied to Vladislaus III of Varna while Ulrich II supported Ladislas the Posthumous's eventual right to the throne.

Ulrich II's forces were commanded by the Celian - Czech mercenary Jan Vitovec. They were ultimately victorious, taking Banić prisoner after the battle. However, the infant Ladislas' mother, Elisabeth of Bohemia (1409–1442), died the following year forcing Ulrich II to recognize Vladislaus III as king, as well as releasing all prisoners. Vladislaus III died soon after against the Ottoman Empire in the Battle of Varna of 1444.

On the 565th anniversary of the battle, March 1, 2006, the city of Samobor hosted a large re-creation of the event.

References 
Battle of Samobor 1441 at Vojska.net

1441 in Europe
Samobor
Samobor
Samobor
Samobor